Lithocarpus encleisacarpus is a tree in the beech family Fagaceae. The specific epithet is from the Greek meaning "enclosed fruit", referring to the acorns and cupules. The cupule is not fused to the nut though and often becomes irregularly dehiscent. The degree to which the nut is enclosed by the cupule varies across its geographic range.  Trees in Lithocarpus are commonly known as the stone oaks and differ from Quercus primarily because they produce insect-pollinated flowers.

Description
The greyish brown bark is smooth or scaly or lenticellate. The fruits typically have 1-1.5 cm stalks and the cupule has several smooth to slightly ridge-like lamellae circling or spiraling around the outside. The nuts are free from the cupule and have silvery tomentum.

Distribution and habitat
Lithocarpus encleisacarpus grows naturally in Thailand, Peninsular Malaysia, Singapore, Sumatra and Borneo.

Uses
The timber is locally used as firewood and in construction. The bark's tannins are used in dyeing.

References

encleisocarpus
Trees of Thailand
Trees of Malaya
Trees of Sumatra
Trees of Borneo
Plants described in 1842